Tipularia discolor, the crippled cranefly or crane-fly orchid, is a perennial terrestrial woodland orchid, a member of the family Orchidaceae.  It is the only species of the genus Tipularia found in North America. It occurs in the southeastern United States from Texas to Florida, the range extending north into the Ohio Valley and along the Appalachians as far north as the Catskills. There are also isolated populations in Massachusetts and in the Great Lakes region.

Tipularia discolor grows a single leaf in September that disappears in the spring. The leaf top is green, often with dark purple spots. The leaf underside is a striking purple color. The flower blooms in mid-July to late August. The roots are a connected series of edible corms. They are starchy and almost potato-like.

The plant is pollinated by noctuid moths, by means of flowers which incline slightly to the right or left, so the pollinaria can attach to one of the moth's compound eyes. The details of the inflorescence can be seen in a video recorded in State Botanical Gardens in Athens, GA 
.

Crane-fly orchids are endangered, threatened, or rare in several states.

References

External links 

discolor
Orchids of the United States